Yakum (lit. "He (The People) shall rise") is a kibbutz in central Israel. Located in the central part of the Israeli coastal plain, about 30 km north of Tel Aviv, and only 5 km from the southern suburbs of Netanya, it falls under the jurisdiction of Hof HaSharon Regional Council.

History

In 1934 a group of young German immigrants were gathered at kibbutz Ein Harod to form the nucleus for the new kibbutz. In 1938 Yakum was founded as Kibbutz Eretz-Israel Dalet in the town of Hadera. However, the kibbutz was not allocated any land until 1947, when some land near Wadi Falik was designated for the establishment of the kibbutz. During the waiting period, the members were joined by groups of newcomers from Germany, Hungary, and Poland. Until the pre-state institutions decided where to settle them, the members were sent to work at established settlements in the Galilee, such as Yavne'el.

In 1947, the kibbutz was finally established at its current location, and it was named "Yakum" by the Central Naming Committee of Israel. The members were not fond of the name and appealed to the committee to have it changed. At a kibbutz gathering on 5 May 1947, alternative names were proposed by the members, but the committee rejected the appeal, and the name stood.

Yakum is located on lands which used to belong to  the depopulated Palestinian village  of  Khirbat al-Zababida.

Economics
The kibbutz struggled financially during the first years, dependent on growing oranges, managing the herd of milking cows, cultivating field crops and mining "Zif-zif" (used as sand for building in Israel).

Agriculture was the main occupation of the kibbutz until 1964, when the kibbutz acquired a small private plastic factory." This was the mark for the process of industrialization of the kibbutz, a process which is entering its second stage in recent years, as Yakum is supporting new ventures like the Europark, the gas & service station, and other real estate ventures.

In 1947 the kibbutz operated a small underground weapons factory, manufacturing Sten guns.

In 1964, the kibbutz established "Plastiv", a blow-molding and injection plastic factory, and years later signed contracts with "Reid Plastics" for the manufacture and distribution of Lexan containers, and with "Elopak", a Norwegian firm, for the manufacture and distribution of plastic caps for paper containers.

In 1992, the members of kibbutz Yakum began the process of privatization. The process was initiated in order to supply the members of the kibbutz with enough financial resources to purchase services previously supplied free-of-charge by the community resources, such as: clothing, furniture, home appliances, and food.

Yakum is now an industrial collective, and tries to take advantages of its local real-estate instead of agriculture. A main income source is the salaries earned by kibbutz members working for companies outside the kibbutz.

Attractions
Yad Recha Frier is a two-building cultural center named in memory of Recha Freier, a youth aliyah heroine during World War II. The center is devoted to educating youth about the history of Central Europe and serves as the home of the Youth Aliyah Orchestra and for performing groups from the Kibbutz Movement.

Volunteers
Since the late 1960s Kibbutz Yakum has hosted thousands of volunteers from around the world. These volunteers came to Yakum to experience Kibbutz life, and to learn about Israel in general. Through their shared experience, over the years, international volunteers have created a fraternity of friendship between the volunteers themselves, as well as with Kibbutz members. Inevitably, a number of Kibbutz members married international volunteers and have created families.

Notable people

 Zvi Eckstein

References

External links
 

Kibbutzim
Kibbutz Movement
Privatized kibbutzim
Populated places established in 1947
1947 establishments in Mandatory Palestine
Populated places in Central District (Israel)
German-Jewish culture in Israel